Citizen's Police Academy is a program designed to acquaint community residents who are not sworn police officers with the activities of their local police department.

The programs vary by department.  One common feature is the option to participate in a ride-along with a police officer for a shift to see what a day as a police officer is like.

Typical academy content 
Programs include topics like:
Department Organization and Ethics
 Overview of the Legal System - Criminal/Constitutional Law
 Use of Force - Patrol Procedures
 Firearms Training
 SWAT Demonstrations
 K-9 Demonstrations
 Air Support
 Homicide
 Traffic/DWI Enforcement
 Jail tours
 Cadet Training
 Bomb Squad
 Forensics
Recruiting 
Domestic Violence
Station Tour
Dispatch Tour
Crime Scene Investigation
Criminal and Youth Investigation

Related programs 
Community Emergency Response Team
 Citizen's Fire Academy

External links 
Austin Texas Citizen Police Academy
Boynton Beach Citizen Police Academy
Spark's Citizen's Police Academy
Livermore Citizen's Police Academy
LVMPD Citizen's Police Academy
 Calgary Citizen's Police Academy
 New York City
Elk Grove Village Police Academy

Also see: List of other Citizens' Academies
Law enforcement in the United States
Law enforcement in Canada